Grotto Island is a narrow island  long with a serrated coastline, lying  north of Galindez Island in the Argentine Islands, Wilhelm Archipelago, Antarctica. It was charted and named in 1935 by the British Graham Land Expedition under John Rymill.

See also 
 List of Antarctic and sub-Antarctic islands

References

Islands of the Wilhelm Archipelago